Conley's Ford Covered Bridge was built in 1906 and crosses Big Raccoon Creek on County Road 550 East close to County Road 720 South, in Parke County, IN. The bridge is a single span Burr Arch Truss structure. The Conley's Ford Covered Bridge was built by J. Lawrence Van Fossen.

History
Unlike the other covered bridges in Parke County, Conley's Ford was made of white pine, and not poplar. The bridge also lays claim to being the world's fourth longest single span covered bridge.

It was added to the National Register of Historic Places in 1978.

In 1991 the bridge was re-sided and re-roofed. It also had its "Daniels Portals" converted into "Britton Portals" along with the build date being changed to "1907" from "1906-07". From old photos it is known that commissioners, auditors, treasurer and builder were once included on the portals.

Gallery

See also
 List of Registered Historic Places in Indiana
 Parke County Covered Bridges
 Parke County Covered Bridge Festival

References

External links

Parke County Covered Bridge Festival

Covered bridges on the National Register of Historic Places in Parke County, Indiana
Bridges completed in 1907
Wooden bridges in Indiana
Burr Truss bridges in the United States